Don Cameron (born 17 July 1931) is a former Australian rules footballer who played with Melbourne in the Victorian Football League (VFL).

Notes

External links 

1931 births
Living people
Australian rules footballers from Victoria (Australia)
Melbourne Football Club players
Bairnsdale Football Club players